The Ford Territory is a compact crossover SUV produced by Ford through the JMC-Ford joint venture in China since 2018. It reuses the nameplate from the previous Australian market Territory crossover, with no relations between them.

The first-generation model was introduced in China in 2018 as a rebadged and modified Yusheng S330 which is produced by Ford partner JMC. In 2022, Ford used the nameplate for the export version of the Equator Sport, which is also produced by JMC-Ford in China.



First generation (CX743; 2018) 

The first-generation Chinese-made Territory was introduced during the 2018 Chengdu Auto Show in September 2018. It is based on the JMC-developed Yusheng S330 which was introduced for the Chinese market in 2016. The Territory went on sale in early 2019, with Ford China classifying it as an entry-level compact SUV in between the EcoSport and Escape.

The model is assembled at JMC Ford's plant in Nanchang, China. Despite not being offered in the Australian market, Ford Australia had input in the design and development of the new Territory. Ride, handling, and NVH were tuned at Ford's Geelong Proving Grounds in Australia and in Nanjing, China.

The Ford Territory was given a mild refresh in early 2020 prior to its introduction in export markets. Changes to the Territory include a gloss black grille with a new pattern and restyled LED taillights.

From China, the model has been exported throughout South America and several left-hand drive Southeast Asian markets. The Territory was introduced in Brazil and Argentina on 7 August 2020, with units arriving at Ford dealerships in Brazil in September 2020. Pre-sale of the Territory in Chile began in the second half of August 2020 with deliveries in mid-September 2020.  In August 2020, it made its debut in the Philippine market, and in Laos in December 2020. The model was also released in Vietnam on 11 April 2021.

Powertrain 
The Territory is powered by a 1.5-litre EcoBoost 145 based on the JX4G15 gasoline engine developed by JMC and AVL. Ford of Europe also helped in developing the powerplant.

A 48V mild-hybrid version is available in China.

Territory EV 
In August 2019, Ford released an electric version of the Territory in China.

Safety recalls 
On 19 February 2021, Ford Philippines issued a recall on the Territory due to a faulty electric battery sensor or EBS bracket together with the wiring harness attached to the bracket.

Second generation (CX756; 2022) 

In May 2022, Ford released the Equator Sport, a two-row version of the Equator, for markets outside China under the Territory nameplate. The Territory was introduce for the Mexican market on October 5, 2022.

Sales

References

External links

Territory
2010s cars
Compact sport utility vehicles
Crossover sport utility vehicles
Cars of China
Cars introduced in 2018
Front-wheel-drive vehicles